The 1998 Tour de Pologne was the 55th edition of the Tour de Pologne cycle race and was held from 6 September to 14 September 1998. The race started in Słupsk and finished in Wieliczka. The race was won by Sergei Ivanov.

General classification

References

1998
Tour de Pologne
Tour de Pologne